Erebus aerosa is a moth of the family Erebidae first described by Charles Swinhoe in 1900. It is found in Indonesia.

References

Moths described in 1900
Erebus (moth)